1138 is the natural number following 1137 and preceding 1139.

George Lucas references
Filmmaker George Lucas places the number 1138 into many of his Lucasfilm productions and LucasArts games. It was first referenced in Lucas' college short film Electronic Labyrinth: THX 1138 4EB, later remade into the 1971 feature film THX 1138.

References in Lucas's films 
 American Graffiti (1973): The number-plate of Paul Le Mat's deuce coupe is THX 138.
 Star Wars (1977): 1138 is the number of the cell block on the Death Star that Luke Skywalker claims to be transferring Chewbacca from. Additionally, the Imperial Stormtrooper suit Luke Skywalker stole in the Death Star belongs to a Stormtrooper with the registration TK-421, but this was scripted and appears in the novelization as THX 1138. Finally, when C-3PO asks Han and Luke what they should do if they are discovered in the hangar control of the Death Star, the monitor behind the robots shows "THX/1138".
 The Empire Strikes Back (1980): In an approximation of the 1138 meme, General Rieekan issues the following order: "Send Rogues 10 and 11 to Station 3-8".
 Raiders of the Lost Ark (1981): The number is heard spoken through an intercom in German, "Eins-eins-drei-acht". The wing number on a plane also reads THX-1138.
 Return of the Jedi (1983): The number 1138 is inscribed on the side of Boushh's helmet.
 Indiana Jones and the Last Crusade (1989): 1138 is shown in Roman numerals (MCXXXVIII) in Dr. Jones' notebook in the library scene.
 Star Wars: Episode I – The Phantom Menace (1999): 1138 can be seen on the back of the battle droid that Jar Jar Binks hits over the head after the destruction of the droid control ship.
 Star Wars: Episode II – Attack of the Clones (2002): When Mace Windu orders a clone pilot to land in an assembly area, 1138 can be seen on the back of the pilot's helmet in LED lights. Later, when Padmé tumbles down a sand dune, 1138 can be briefly seen inscribed in the sand. 
 Star Wars: Episode III – Revenge of the Sith (2005): Although not spoken or seen in the final film, CC-1138 is the numerical designation for Commander Bacara, one of the clone troopers seen in the Order 66 sequence. The DVD release contains an Easter egg where a short video clip of Yoda break dancing is shown when the numbers 1-1-3-8 are entered on a remote control.
 Indiana Jones and the Kingdom of the Crystal Skull (2008):  A 1932 Ford Roadster in the opening scene has a license plate reading THX 138, as tribute to American Graffiti.

In other media and films
 Maniac Mansion: The number-plate of the Edison's Edsel car is THX 1138. The code for the safe is 1138. It is also one of the randomly chosen numbers for the Meteor Police in the NES and Commodore 64 versions.
 Zak McKracken and the Alien Mindbenders: The phone bill says Zak owes $1138.
 Outlaws: The train in the introduction has the number 1138 on its front.
 Escape from Monkey Island: When Guybrush meets with his future self in the Mists O' Tyme Marsh, he asks him "If you really are me, then what number am I thinking right now?" One of the answers his alter ego might give is "1138". Later in the game, Guybrush meets a ghostly priest who has deified LeChuck, and also believes in "the Anti-LeChuck", a  demonized version of Guybrush with 1138 tattooed on his forehead.
 Star Tours: When a guest is waiting in this Disney attraction's spaceport, various announcements can be heard over a PA system in between R2-D2 and C-3PO's conversations—one says: "will the owners of a red-and-black landspeeder, vehicle ID THX-1138, please return to your craft. You are parked in a no-hover area."
 Star Wars: The Clone Wars: In Episode 1, Season 3, the final test for the clone cadets is retrieved from file THX, variable 1138.
 Star Wars: The Force Unleashed: Stormtroopers in the medical room refer to Starkiller as subject 1138.
 Star Wars: Republic Commando: The lead character's codename is RC-1138
 Star Wars: The Force Unleashed II: The clearance code to dock on the Salvation is 'Talus Haroon 10-11-38'. Since 10 is X in Roman numerals, the code can be read as 'TH X-11-38'.
 Star Wars: Jedi Knight II: Jedi Outcast: In the cutscene preceding the first of the Cairn levels, an imperial voice is heard saying "Automated Transport 1-138".
 Star Wars: Galactic Battlegrounds: When selecting an Trooper unit with the Imperial design (a Stormtrooper), he will sometimes say "THX-1138 ready, Sir."
 Star Wars: The Force Awakens (2015): A stormtrooper is referred to by the designation 1138 during the battle at Maz Kanata's castle.

Other references
Even in media unrelated to Lucasfilm, the number is occasionally featured (generally without the prefix THX), sometimes to popularize the injoke or to tribute Lucas and/or Lucasfilm media.

Film
 Absolon, the number of the address on the computer screen, when Christopher Lambert's character is tracked down by satellite, is 1138
 The Adventures of Buckaroo Banzai Across the 8th Dimension, the number 11-1-38 is mentioned by the Hong Kong Cavaliers in a conversation in the middle of the movie, while they discuss the identity of the Yoyodyne company.
 Agent Cody Banks, at the end, Arnold Vosloo's character Francois Molay wears orange prison garb with the inmate number AR 1138
 Continental Divide, when John Belushi pulls away from the curb in a taxi, the one behind him is number 1138.
 Crash and Burn, a Charles Band film & Full Moon production - when the robot is damaged the pilot sees on the screen a message: ERROR 1138
 Mandroid, another Charles Band film - the character gets on a train, the train car is numbered 11 38
 Follow That Bird, Big Bird flies to Oceanview, Illinois on Flight CTW 1138
 George Lucas in Love, 1138 appears in the last seconds of the film as Lucas' college dorm room address.
 Mission: Impossible, Ethan Hunt's clearance code for the secure call is Bravo Echo One One. BE11, when mirrored, becomes 1138
 Monsters, Inc., one of the CDA (Child Detection Agency) agents near the end of the movie (when Roz, agent 001, enters the room) has the number on the uniform. Also, one of the agents coming out of the toilet has the number. These are different characters in appearance even though they share the same number.
 Ocean's Eleven, the code Linus uses to unlock the security door leading to the safe is 1138
 Reign Over Me, the number of Dr. Oakhurst's office
 Sky Captain and the World of Tomorrow, when Polly Perkins and Joe Sullivan arrive at the laboratory of Dr. Walter Jennings, the address on the front door is numbered 1138.
 Sneakers, at the very beginning, the access code entered ends in 1138
 Storm, 1138 is used as a door code to a building where a LAN party is held
 The Lawnmower Man, the test chimp from the beginning of the movie is later referred as Rosco 1138
 The Matrix, at the end, when Neo places a call from a phone booth, the cascading digits freeze and the number 1138 can be seen brighter than the rest in the bottom-right corner
 District 9, during the first opening shot of the alien mother ship, 11:38 is the time recorded on the camera.
 In Bitch Slap, during the flashback titled "7 weeks ago", one of the two lesbian cell mates' prisoner number is 1138, as mentioned by the prison guard.
 In the short film Where Is Your Head (2010), and its alternative black-and-white version Sleepyhead by Bulgarian writer/director Nenko Genov, the main character inputs the code 1-1-3-8 on the dial of his alarm just before leaving his home.
 Iron Sky (2012), when Renate Richter returns to destroyed moon base, her space suit has "SS-1138" in the chest.
 Riddick (2013), when examining the area where Riddick has set the traps, one of the bounty hunters reports "Right here! 13-8!
 In The Asylum film American Warships, a crate containing 16-inch shells on the Battleship USS Iowa, has 8311-XHT printed on it.
 In Spaceballs, Princess Vespa is being held in cell 8311.
 Fifty Shades Darker (2017), Christian Grey's Audi Q7 has the license plate CGQ-1138.
 In The Lego Batman Movie, the flight at the beginning of the movie is "flight 1138."

Television
 Dancouga - Super Beast Machine God Super Robot anime series, the code THX-1138 was used to activate the combination sequence for the Jyusenki Tai to combine their respective mecha into the gigantic robot Dancouga for the first time in Episode 15.
 Dark Angel episode "Heat", the odometer on Max's bike reads 113.8.
 Dexter's Laboratory episode "Blackfoot and Slim", the tag that the observation team places on Dexter's ear at the end of the episode reads 1138.
 Firefly episode "The Train Job", the number A:1138 is written on top of the train being robbed as Jayne jumps onto it from Serenity.
 Futurama episode "Leela and the Genestalk", the Planet Express crew visit a 'redneck' bar called TEX 1138'S.
 Giri/Haji in the first episode, the electronic code to the door of murder victim Saburo Endo's home is 1138.
 Graceland episode "Pawn", the case number for Paul Briggs is TX1138.
 Magnum, P.I. episode "Don't Eat the Snow in Hawaii", when Magnum is trying to steal the Ferrari and needs to disarm the code, the first combo he puts in is 1138.
 Pinky and the Brain, in one version of the opening song, the Brain is seen writing an equation on a chalkboard, where he writes "THX=1138".
 ReBoot, Used as a heading for spacecraft in Episode 1 (v1.1) - The Tearing. Used again as the approach vector for the remains of the CPU defense force in Episode 24 (v3.1.1).
 Robot Chicken episodes:
 "Junk in the Trunk", the cell behind a Cylon in the 'Bloopers' skit is marked 1138.
 "Toy Meets Girl", Panthro of the ThunderCats is incarcerated in cell 1138.
 "Adoption's an Option", when Skynet takes control of Inspector Gadget, in his goggles he sees Penny as "Target: 1138".
 "Star Wars" Special, the address number above Ponda Baba's door is 1138.
 Star Wars Episode III, IG-88 takes his cousin called THX-1138 to a party.
 Smallville, Lex Luthor is working on a project entitled Project 1138 (see the episode "Thirst"). NB: Carrie Fisher appears in the episode
 Supernatural, in Season 8 Episode 22 Sam and Dean are working on case number 1138, they find a short film in the evidence files for case 1138.
 The West Wing, in the season 2 episode "Bad Moon Rising" when C.J. asks her assistant, Carol, how many more interviews she has left to find the source of a press leak; the answer is 1138.
 Chuck, Episode 58 "Chuck vs. the Coup D'Etat", the number on the nuclear missile control panel is 01138.
 Chuck, Episode 83 "Chuck vs. the Hack Off", Morgan requests a prisoner transfer from the cell block "CB11, section 3 8".
 X-Men, in "Beyond Good and Evil Part 2", the license plate on Psylocke's car reads "THX 1138".
 BoJack Horseman, in season 3, episode 1: "Start Spreading the News", the address on the house of Oxnard, Mr. Peanutbutter's accountant is 1138.
 Dragon Ball GT, in "Discovering the Truth", the flight that Baby uses to get off-world is "Flight 1138".
 Josh Kirby... Time Warrior!, one of the main characters is named Irwin 1138.
 The Big Bang Theory, in "The Convention Conundrum", when Sheldon and James Earl Jones go to prank Carrie Fisher, her house number is shown to be 138.
 Criminal Minds, Season 7, Episode 5 "From Childhoods' Hour", when the "unsub" logs off his computer a log screen pops up that says "OPERATOR 1138".
 Doctor Who: In the Series 9 episode "The Magician's Apprentice", the Doctor travels to Essex in 1138 A.D.
 Legends,  in "Identity", Martin discovers that he has an infrared tattoo on his arm reading 02TH-X11-38C3.
 Arrow, Season 5, Episode 4, Diggle is being held in cell 1138.
 Young Sheldon, pilot episode, the bus in the parking lot when Sheldon arrives at school for the first day is #1138.
 The Office: In the 2012 episode "The Boat", Angela Martin refers to being out of "1138 forms".
 Peacemaker, in the first episode the title character's home has address numbers 1138 on it.

Other
 Adventures in Odyssey, in the "Wonderworld" episode of the radio series, Jimmy Barclay and Lawrence Hodges pretend to be secret agents with code names Agent THX1138 and Agent NCC-1701.
 Batman comic, Hush story arc, issue #611, Clark Kent changes into Superman in the Daily Planet room #1138.
 Dark Claw Adventures #1 comic, Talia summons Agent THX-1138.
 Bully video game, the code used to unlock the security door leading to the observatory is 1138.
 "Robot Chicken", a Magic: The Gathering promo card, has a fake 1138 collector's number.
 "We Are 138", the Misfits song similarly about a dystopian future where the question is asked, "Is it time to be an android not a man?" may be a reference to THX1138, singer Glenn Danzig having removed the first digit to fit the words into the rhythm of the song.
 "Time of Eve", featured a robot called THX and mentioned a rule #1138.
 "Back to the Future", The Ride — the number 1138 is featured on one of the videos broadcast from Doc Brown's laboratory.
 L.A. Noire video game - Patrol Desk - Handgun Clue - Browning Gun Model 01138.
 Duke Nukem Forever video game - When you get in the turret, he keys in 1138 on his keypad.
 Mr. Robot video game - Model number of the protagonist robot "Asimov", addressed by HEL as said number.
 Isaac Asimov's Robots VCR Mystery Game includes one robot with the serial number 1138.
 Payday 2 - the code for the door in the First World Bank heist and the code for the shutters in the Ukrainian Job heist is always 1138.
 The Madagaskar Plan, alternate history novel, the number of Madeleine's house in Antzu, that both the hero and villain are looking for, is 1138.
 Linux Format magazine - Tux appears on the cover of issue 226 (August 2017) in an orange prison jumpsuit with the number TUX1138 on the lapel.
1138 is the official team number designation for Eagle Engineering, an award-winning robotics team from Chaminade College Preparatory High School in West Hills, CA.
 In the 2017 point and click adventure game Thimbleweed Park, 1138 is the lucky number of Uncle Chuck, the number that won him the lottery, and the number used to decode his will. Also, a certain carney needs $1138 that Ransome the Clown has to pay up to get his joke book back. Thimbleweed Parks main developers were Ron Gilbert and Gary Winnick, creating the game as an homage to the classic LucasArts titles they had worked on many years prior.

References

External links
 Welcome to TK-421's post

George Lucas
Integers
In-jokes